The Magic of Christmas may refer to:

The Magic of Christmas (Nat King Cole album), 1960
The Magic of Christmas (Natalie Cole album), 1999
The Magic of Christmas (Joy Electric album), 2003
The Magic of Christmas (Marie Osmond album), 2007
The Magic of Christmas (Samantha Jade album), 2018
The Magic of Christmas (Celtic Woman album), 2019
The Magic of Christmas, a 2013 album by Jim Brickman

See also
Christmas Magic (disambiguation)